Capacity is the second studio album by the American band Big Thief, released through Saddle Creek Records on June 9, 2017.

Cover artwork
The album's cover features a photograph of Lenker's uncle holding her as a newborn.

Critical reception

Capacity received critical acclaim upon its release. At Metacritic, which assigns a normalized rating out of 100 to reviews from music critics, the album has received an average score of 81, indicating "universal acclaim", based on 15 reviews.

Accolades

Track listing

Personnel
Credits adapted from the album's liner notes.

Big Thief
 Adrianne Lenker – vocals (all tracks), acoustic guitar (1, 2, 4–7, 9), electric guitar (2–8, 11), background vocals (2, 4, 6, 8, 11), choir (3), French press (3), mouth trumpet (7), claps (8), ARP synthesizer (9)
 Buck Meek – electric guitar (2–4, 6–9, 11), choir (3), background vocals (5, 6, 8, 9), claps (8)
 Max Oleartchik – upright bass (1, 3), bass (2, 4–9, 11), choir (3)
 James Krivchenia – drums (2–9, 11), percussion (2–9), choir (3), Casio SK-1 (5), bells (6), howls (6), acoustic guitar (6), claps (8, 9), lap harp (8), background vocals (9), organ (10)

Additional musicians
 Andrew Sarlo – piano (1), choir (3), mouth trumpet (7)
 Unknown – stairs (1)
 Zoë Lenker – background vocals (4, 7, 8)
 Mat Davidson – background vocals (5, 6, 9), acoustic guitar (8), pump organ (8, 10), piano (10)
 Erin Birgy – howls (6)
 Michael Sachs – bass clarinet (10)

Technical personnel
 Andrew Sarlo – production (all tracks), engineering (all tracks), mixing (all tracks)
 Greg Calbi – mastering
 Josh Druckman – engineering [basics] (8)

Artwork
 Josh Goleman – band photo

Notes

References

Saddle Creek Records albums
2017 albums
Big Thief albums